The term intraplate earthquake refers to a variety of earthquake that occurs within the interior of a tectonic plate; this stands in contrast to an interplate earthquake, which occurs at the boundary of a tectonic plate. Intraplate earthquakes are often called "intraslab earthquakes", especially when occurring in microplates.

Intraplate earthquakes are relatively rare compared to the more familiar boundary-located interplate earthquakes.  Structures far from plate boundaries tend to lack seismic retrofitting, so large intraplate earthquakes can inflict heavy damage. Examples of damaging intraplate earthquakes are the devastating Gujarat earthquake in 2001, the 2012 Indian Ocean earthquakes, the 2017 Puebla earthquake, the 1811–1812 earthquakes in New Madrid, Missouri, and the 1886 earthquake in Charleston, South Carolina.

Fault zones within tectonic plates
The surface of the Earth is made up of seven primary and eight secondary tectonic plates, plus dozens of tertiary microplates. The large plates move very slowly, owing to convection currents within the mantle below the crust. Because they do not all move in the same direction, plates often directly collide or move laterally along each other, a tectonic environment that makes earthquakes frequent. Relatively few earthquakes occur in intraplate environments; most occur on faults near plate margins.

By definition, intraplate earthquakes do not occur near plate boundaries, but along faults in the normally stable interior of plates. These earthquakes often occur at the location of ancient failed rifts, because such old structures may present a weakness in the crust where it can easily slip to accommodate regional tectonic strain.

Compared to earthquakes near plate boundaries (megathrust earthquakes), intraslab earthquakes at a similar magnitude radiate more seismic energy. Thus "seismic energy" is considered a better measure for the potential macroseismic effects of an earthquake as compared to the seismic moment used to calculate M w."

Examples
Examples of intraplate earthquakes include those in Mineral, Virginia in 2011 (estimated magnitude 5.8), Newcastle, New South Wales in 1989, New Madrid in 1811 and 1812 (estimated magnitude as high as 8.6), the Boston (Cape Ann) earthquake of 1755 (estimated magnitude 6.0 to 6.3), earthquakes felt in New York City in 1737 and 1884 (both quakes estimated at about 5.5 magnitude), and the Charleston earthquake in South Carolina in 1886 (estimated magnitude 6.5 to 7.3).  The Charleston quake was particularly surprising because, unlike Boston and New York, the area had almost no history of even minor earthquakes.

In 2001, a large intraplate earthquake devastated the region of Gujarat, India. The earthquake occurred far from any plate boundaries, which meant the region above the epicenter was unprepared for earthquakes. In particular, the Kutch district suffered tremendous damage, where the death toll was over 12,000 and the total death toll was higher than 20,000.

In 2017, the 24–29 km deep magnitude 6.5 Botswana earthquake that shook eastern Botswana occurred at over 300 km from the nearest active plate boundary. The event occurred in an underpopulated area of Botswana.

The 1888 earthquake in Río de la Plata was an intraplate quake, from reactivated faults in the  Quilmes Trough, far from the boundaries of the South American Plate. With a magnitude greater than 5.0 it was felt "in the cities of Buenos Aires, La Plata and other small towns and villages along the Rio de Plata coastal regions." The towns of Punta del Este and Maldonado in Uruguay were hit by a tsunami generated by the quake.

Causes
Many cities live with the seismic risk of a rare, large intraplate earthquake. The cause of these earthquakes is often uncertain. In many cases, the causative fault is deeply buried, and sometimes cannot even be found. Some studies have shown that it can be caused by fluids moving up the crust along ancient fault zones. In such circumstances, it is difficult to calculate the exact seismic hazard for a given city, especially if there was only one earthquake in historical times. Some progress is being made in understanding the fault mechanics driving these earthquakes.

Intraplate earthquakes may be unrelated to ancient fault zones and instead caused by deglaciation or erosion.

Prediction
Scientists continue to search for the causes of these earthquakes, and especially for some indication of how often they recur.  The best success has come with detailed micro-seismic monitoring, involving dense arrays of seismometers.  In this manner, very small earthquakes associated with a causative fault can be located with great accuracy, and in most cases these line up in patterns consistent with faulting. Cryoseisms can sometimes be mistaken for intraplate earthquakes.

See also

References

Further reading 
Stein, S., and S. Mazzotti (2007). "Continental Intraplate Earthquakes: Science and Policy Issues", Geological Society of America, Special Paper 425.

External links
Intraplate Earthquakes: Possible Mechanisms for the New Madrid and Charleston Earthquakes
Symptomatic Features of Intraplate Earthquakes – PDF
A physical understanding of large intraplate earthquakes – PDF
Earthquake Hazards Program, USGS

Types of earthquake

ja:地震#内陸地殻内地震